S.I.P.E. Law College is a private aided law school situated at Sishu Bharati Bhawan, Graham Bazar in Dibrugarh in the Indian state of Assam. It offers 5 Years Integrated Honours Law courses in three different streams, such as BB.A., LL.B(Hons.), B.A.,LL.B.(Hons.) and B.Com., LL.B.(Hons.) courses affiliated to Dibrugarh University. This College is recognised by Bar Council of India (BCI), New Delhi.

History
S.I.P.E. Law College was established in 2010 Shreebharati Institute of Professional Education, a non-profit organization and educationists of Assam.

References

Law schools in Assam
Colleges affiliated to Dibrugarh University
Educational institutions established in 2010
2010 establishments in Assam
Universities and colleges in Assam